Thomas Hitzlsperger (born 5 April 1982) is a German director of football and former footballer who played as a midfielder. In February 2019, he was appointed Head of Sport of VfB Stuttgart and was subsequently promoted to CEO. In March 2022,  he stepped down from this position.

As a player he spent the early part of his career playing for Aston Villa in England (accompanied by a short loan spell at Chesterfield), before returning to Germany to play for Stuttgart, where he was a member of the team which won the Bundesliga in 2007. In 2010, he signed for Italian side Lazio, before moving back to England to join West Ham United later that year. He then had brief spells with Wolfsburg and Everton.

Hitzlsperger also represented the Germany national team, earning 52 caps and being selected for the 2006 World Cup and Euro 2008.  Following a series of injuries, he retired from football in September 2013. After his retirement, he came out as gay,  the highest-profile male footballer in the world to do so.

Club career

Early career
After joining the VfB Forstinning youth team in 1988, Hitzlsperger signed to the Bayern Munich Junior Team, but agreed to leave at the end of the 1999–2000 season.

Aston Villa
After a short trial with Celtic in August 2000, Hitzlsperger joined Aston Villa on a free youth transfer from Bayern Munich. He made his Aston Villa debut in a 3–0 home defeat to Liverpool on 13 January 2001 as an 84th-minute substitute for Jlloyd Samuel; it was his only appearance during his first season in England.

Whilst at Aston Villa, Hitzlsperger was briefly loaned out to Second Division club Chesterfield during the 2001–02 season, making his debut in a 1–0 home win against Kidderminster Harriers in the Football League Trophy second round. On 21 November, his link was extended for another month. In all he made six appearances for the Spireites, five of which were in the league. He was recalled by Aston Villa during the second month of the loan spell however, as the Birmingham club had several players injured or suspended. On 20 April 2002, away to already relegated Leicester City, he hit the post after five minutes, from which Peter Crouch opened the scoring from the rebound; Hitzlsperger later scored his first senior goal in the 2–2 draw, from a solo run.

Hitzlsperger moved into the Aston Villa first team following the arrival of new manager Graham Taylor. On 14 December 2002, his last-minute 30-yard strike past Russell Hoult sealed a 2–1 win over rivals West Bromwich Albion. He later played a significant part in the Aston Villa side that finished sixth under David O'Leary, before falling out of favour the following season. Hitzlsperger left Aston Villa as a fan favourite, and stated that he might return to the club when the opportunity comes. He gained the nickname  (The Hammer) during his time at Villa Park, due to his powerful left-foot shot from long-range. A fluent speaker of English, he acquired an unusual Brummie-German hybrid accent during his spell at Villa.

Stuttgart

Hitzlsperger signed for VfB Stuttgart in the summer of 2005, having left Aston Villa on a Bosman free transfer. He became a regular for Stuttgart, particularly in his second season in which the team won the Bundesliga title. Hitzlsperger made a large contribution to their success, playing in 30 of the team's 34 league matches and scoring seven times. He scored a crucial equaliser in the 27th minute of Stuttgart's final match of the season against Energie Cottbus – had Stuttgart lost that match, Schalke 04 would have won the title. In the end, a 63rd-minute goal by Sami Khedira secured the title for Stuttgart.

On 14 August 2007, Hitzlsperger extended his contract until the summer of 2010. On 22 July 2008, he was appointed the new captain  by manager Armin Veh following the departure of Fernando Meira. On 1 December 2009, he was deposed as team captain by Stuttgart's new manager Markus Babbel.

Lazio
On 31 January 2010, Hitzlsperger moved to Lazio on six-month contract, for around €550,000. He scored his only goal for Lazio on 15 May in a 3–1 win against Udinese.

West Ham United

Hitzlsperger signed a three-year deal with Premier League club West Ham United in June 2010, but due to an injury did not make his debut for the Hammers until an FA Cup fifth round match against Burnley on 21 February 2011, a game in which he scored in the 23rd minute of a 5–1 win with a "trademark thunderbolt" from 25 yards. Hitzlsperger made his league debut for the East London club six days later in a 3–1 win against Liverpool at the Boleyn Ground. He scored his first league goal for West Ham in the 3–0 home win against Stoke City on 5 March. At the end of the season West Ham were relegated to the Football League Championship and Hitzlsperger's contract was terminated.

Wolfsburg
On 17 August 2011, Hitzlsperger signed for Bundesliga club Wolfsburg on a three-year deal, after being released by West Ham three months earlier. His contract was terminated at the end of the season. He played for Stuttgart and Wolfsburg 131 matches in the Bundesliga and scored 20 goals in the German top flight.

Everton
On 19 October 2012, Hitzlsperger joined Premier League club Everton, after a spell on trial with the club, on a short-term contract until January 2013. He made his debut for the Toffees coming on as an 86th-minute substitute for Nikica Jelavić in a 2–1 victory against Sunderland at Goodison Park. He made his first Everton start away to Reading on 17 November. On 11 January 2013 he signed an extension to his contract, keeping him at the club until the end of the season. At the end of the season, he was released along with Ján Mucha.

In September 2013, aged 31, Hitzlsperger announced his retirement from football citing the strain of "many transfers and some injuries". Although he had received offers to resume his playing career, he reported, "I've noticed: I need something else."

International career

Hitzlsperger captained the Germany under-19 team, and also appeared for the national under-21 side. He was then called up to the senior side by Jürgen Klinsmann and made his debut in a 2–0 win against Iran in Tehran on 9 October 2004, replacing Bernd Schneider in the 68th minute.
He appeared at the 2005 Confederations Cup and also at the 2006 World Cup, where he failed to make it into Klinsmann's starting eleven, playing just 11 minutes in the third-place play-off against Portugal. He scored his first international goals on 6 September 2006 in a European Championship qualifying game against San Marino. Hitzlsperger came on as a second-half substitute to score Germany's 9th and 11th goals in a record 13–0 win.

Germany's coach Joachim Löw included Hitzlsperger in his squad for the 2008 Euros, but did not start him in any of the three group games. Hitzlsperger came on as a second-half substitute in the victories over Poland and Austria, but did not feature at all in the surprise defeat to Croatia. In the knockout stages however, he started in all three matches, helping his team to defeat Portugal in the quarter-final and setting up Philipp Lahm for a 90th-minute winner against Turkey in the semi-final. Germany were defeated 1–0 by Spain in the final, in which Hitzlsperger was substituted in the second half.

Hitzlsperger remained first-choice in 2010 World Cup qualifying, playing in all but one match and scoring a goal, but he missed out on his nation's World Cup squad in June 2010. His international career ended on 11 August 2010 with his 52nd cap.

VfB Stuttgart management
On 12 February 2019, Hitzlsperger became Head of Sport of VfB Stuttgart. He was promoted to CEO and resigned in January 2022 to return to his television career.

Personal life
Hitzlsperger, the youngest child of Ludwig and Anneliese Hitzlsperger, was born in Munich and grew up in Forstinning, alongside his five brothers and one sister. Hitzlsperger  has an interest in economics, and while in England studied investment strategies, although he did not complete the course. He regularly visited the Bank of England to discuss finance with the bank's governor, Mervyn King, a lifelong Aston Villa fan.

Hitzlsperger has blogged for Störungsmelder, an anti-racism site that encourages debate about xenophobia and racism in Germany.

In June 2007, Hitzlsperger split after an eight-year relationship from his longtime girlfriend, Inga, just one month before they were due to get married. On 8 January 2014, he became the highest-profile male footballer to come out as gay to date. Hitzlsperger said that he had only realised that he was gay in the past few years. He received widespread support from former fellow players of the Germany national team, such as Lukas Podolski, who said of his coming out as "brave" and "an important sign of our time" as well as a reaction from Joachim Löw who said of his decision as "personal" and that he "deserved respect from every side."

On 14 July 2011, he was fined £750, plus £85 costs and a £15 victim surcharge, and was given six penalty points on his driving licence by Bury St Edmunds Magistrates' Court. However, he was spared a driving ban as he was at the time unemployed and his barrister, Craig Harris, successfully argued that he needed his car to drive around the country and look for a new club.

In January 2022, Hitzlsperger told ARD, that a "collective coming out" of gay footballers could be a solution to their problems of hiding their sexuality. Hitzlsperger took the example of 125 Catholic priests in Germany who decided to come out at once.

Career statistics

Club

International

Scores and results list Germany's goal tally first, score column indicates score after each Hitzlsperger goal.

Honours
VfB Stuttgart
 Bundesliga: 2006–07
 DFB-Pokal runner-up: 2006–07

Germany
UEFA European Championship runner-up: 2008
FIFA World Cup third place: 2006
FIFA Confederations Cup third place: 2005

Individual
kicker Bundesliga Team of the Season: 2006–07
 Federal Cross of Merit (2020)

References

External links

 
 
 
 
 Blog at Störungsmelder

1982 births
Living people
German footballers
Aston Villa F.C. players
Chesterfield F.C. players
VfB Stuttgart players
S.S. Lazio players
West Ham United F.C. players
VfL Wolfsburg players
Everton F.C. players
Footballers from Munich
Premier League players
English Football League players
Expatriate footballers in England
Expatriate footballers in Italy
Gay sportsmen
German expatriate footballers
Germany international footballers
Germany under-21 international footballers
Germany youth international footballers
2005 FIFA Confederations Cup players
2006 FIFA World Cup players
Bundesliga players
German LGBT footballers
Serie A players
UEFA Euro 2008 players
German expatriate sportspeople in England
Association football midfielders
Recipients of the Cross of the Order of Merit of the Federal Republic of Germany